Coleophora sardocorsa is a moth of the family Coleophoridae. It is found on Corsica and Sardinia.

The larvae feed on Genista aspalathoides and Genista corsica. They create a slender composite leaf case, made out of six or seven mined leaflets. The cases is 9–11 mm, bivalved and has a mouth angle of about 40°. The rearmost leaflet, in which the larva hibernates, is dark brown. The remainder of the case is light brown.

References

sardocorsa
Moths described in 1983
Moths of Europe